Sardoba is an urban-type settlement in Sirdaryo Region, Uzbekistan. It is the administrative center of Oqoltin District. Its population was 11,337 people in 1989, and 16,000 in 2016.

References

Populated places in Sirdaryo Region
Urban-type settlements in Uzbekistan